The 2002–03 Toto Cup Artzit was the 4th time the cup was being contested as a competition for the third tier in the Israeli football league system.

The competition was won, for the second consecutive time, by Hapoel Ashkelon, who had beaten Hapoel Majd al-Krum 2–1 in the final with a golden goal during extra time.

Format change
The 12 Liga Artzit clubs were divided into two groups, each with six clubs, with the top two teams advancing to the quarter-finals.

Group stage

Group A

Group B
On 29 August 2002 Hakoah Ramat Gan was demoted to Liga Artzit and was replaced by Hapoel Tzafririm Holon. As a result, the two matches played by Hapoel Tzafririm Holon before the club was promoted were annulled.

Knockout rounds

Semifinals
{| class="wikitable" style="text-align: center"
|-
!Home Team
!Score
!Away Team
|-

Final

See also
 2002–03 Toto Cup Al

References

External links
 Israel Cups 2002/03 RSSSF

Artzit
Toto Cup Artzit
Toto Cup Artzit